Rakusites Upper Jurassic ammonite belonging to the ammonitida family.

References
Notes

Jurassic ammonites